Abdul Kader Kan (Arabic: عبد القادر; c. 1725 – 26 April 1806) was an 18th-century Islamic scholar and first Almaami of Futa Toro, hailing from what is now Senegal.

Background and Election
Abdul Kader Kan was approximately fifty years old when he was inaugurated as the Almaami of Futa Toro. Before ascending to this position, Kan had been an independent qadi operating near  Bundu who had been educated in  Kajoor. He came from a line of Islamic scholars; his grandfather Lamin had performed the  pilgrimage to Mecca, and his father Hamady studied the Qur'an in  Futa Jallon.  He studied under Moktar Ndumbe Diop, who founded a school at Coki. 

Abdul Kader Kan was one of the candidates for the successor of Sulayman Bal, who had led the  revolt with the intention of overthrowing the  Deeñanke ruling class. According to  Ware, his nomination came after the refusal of the position by another cleric, and his own acceptance was hesitant until Sulayman was killed in battle. Ware attributes this hesitation to the “pious distance” from political power traditionally kept by Senegambian clerics.  Robinson cites what he describes as a more obscure tradition, in which Abdul Kadeer Kan was elected after a longer period of political confusion, and that the torodbe leadership was unsure if they wanted to elect a leader as an Almaami, which would have acted as an explicit declaration for a desire to establish a separate Islamic state. 

Abdul Kader Kan was inaugurated as the Almaami in 1776. Robinson describes a “remarkable continuity with Denyanke installations and similarities with procedures adopted in the Muslim state of Futa Jallon”: Kan was kept in seclusion for a week as sacrifices of livestock were made on his behalf. He was then given a turban signifying his office by a cleric who had served as an advisor to the previous regime.  At least fifty chiefs swore an oath of loyalty to him at this ceremony. One source states that ceremony involved the full recitation of the Qur’an, the ‘Ishriniyyat, and the Dala'il al-Khayrat, with Kan making the clerics who recited them promise to correct him if they saw him failing to live up to the standards set by each work. This information comes from an account citing an earlier record that is no longer extant.

Hostility to the Slave Trade
Based on the letters written by Thomas Clarkson, at least one scholar has made the argument that the reverend believed that Abdul Kader Kan had completely  abolished the slave trade in Futa Toro. One such letter describes Kan as "the wise and virtuous Almaamy" who provides an "illustrious example in extirpating the commerce in the human race." A treaty had been signed which was meant to prevent the French from selling the people of Futa Toro into slavery, and the Almaami's success against the Emirate of Trarza may have been the result of Abdul Kader Kan's willingness to release the slaves of their slaves upon defeat. It has been noted that, while definitive proof of this strategy as a reason for the campaign's success cannot be provided, the promise of releasing the slaves who fought against their masters was a common strategy in Africa as well as America at this time.

The characterization of the Almaami as an abolitionist is not uncontested. Others characterize his policy of slavery as simply more in accord with traditional Islamic slavery; that is to say that while Muslims could not be legally enslaved, nonbelievers were still licit for enslavement. Though French slave traders were not allowed to either enslave the inhabitants of the Futa Toro nor transport slaves through the territory of the Imamate, the inhabitants themselves still owned slaves. According to this understanding, the inhabitants of Futa Toro were not protected because of a general hostility to slavery, but rather because the Almaami's subjects were at least by definition Muslim.

References

1806 deaths
18th-century Muslim scholars of Islam
Fula people
1720s births